Anthela ferruginosa is a species of moth of the family Anthelidae. It is found in Australia.

The wingspan is about 40 mm.

The larvae feed on various Australian Poaceae species.

References

Anthelidae
Moths of Australia
Moths described in 1855